The Order of the Nation is a Jamaican honour. It is a part of the Jamaican honours system and was instituted in 1973 as the second-highest honour in the country, with the Order of National Hero being the highest honour.

The Order of the Nation is only conferred on the Governor-General of Jamaica and upon any person who has been appointed as Prime Minister of Jamaica, unless they are already recipients of the Order of National Hero.

Members of the order and their spouses are styled "The Most Honourable", and members wear the insignia of the order as a decoration while appending the post-nominal letters ON to their name. The motto of the order is "One Nation Under God".

In 2002, all deceased former Prime Ministers of Jamaica were posthumously awarded the Order of the Nation.

References 
Inline

General
Order of the Nation, Office of the Prime Minister.

 
Nation, Order of
Awards established in 1973